Bracknell railway station serves the town of Bracknell in Berkshire, England.

The station, and all trains serving it, are operated by South Western Railway. It is on the Waterloo to Reading line.

History
The station was opened in 1856 by the Staines and Wokingham Railway which was taken over by the London and South Western Railway in 1878. British Railways closed the goods yard in 1969. The station was redeveloped in 1975, and the entrance is now under the Bracknell Quintiles building.

Services

Journey times to London Waterloo are around an hour, whilst to Reading it is 20 mins.

Bracknell bus station is next to the railway station.

Improvements
In 2008 work began to improve access for passengers with wheelchairs, baby-vehicles or bicycles. A new covered footbridge, with both staircases and lifts, was completed and opened in 2009. Before this, the only way to reach the "Down" (Reading-bound) platform was over the steps of the original footbridge at the London end of the platforms. This was a classic Southern Railway design with no roof, built of pre-cast concrete sections. It had also provided direct access from Crowthorne Road North, but this extra span had long been disconnected. Once the new bridge was opened, the old bridge was taken out of use and fenced off. It was demolished in May 2009.
In 2017 the platforms were extended to accommodate 10 to 12 car trains with the increase of passengers on the line

References

External links

 

Railway stations in Berkshire
DfT Category C2 stations
Former London and South Western Railway stations
Railway stations in Great Britain opened in 1856
Railway stations served by South Western Railway
Bracknell